The ninth season of the American television series Bones premiered on September 16, 2013, and concluded on May 19, 2014, on Fox. The show maintained its previous time slot, airing on Mondays at 8:00 pm ET, then moved to Fridays at 8:00 pm starting November 15, 2013, and returned to Mondays at 8:00 pm beginning March 10, 2014. The season consists of 24 episodes.

Cast and characters

Main cast 
 Emily Deschanel as Dr. Temperance "Bones" Brennan, a forensic anthropologist, and wife of Seeley Booth 
 David Boreanaz as FBI Special Agent Seeley Booth, who is the official FBI liaison with the Jeffersonian, and husband of Temperance Brennan 
 Michaela Conlin as Angela Montenegro, a forensic artist and wife of Jack Hodgins
 Tamara Taylor as Dr. Camille Saroyan, a forensic pathologist and the head of the forensic division
 T. J. Thyne as Dr. Jack Hodgins, an entomologist, mineralogist, palynologist, and forensic chemist, and husband of Angela Montenegro
 John Francis Daley as Dr. Lance Sweets, an FBI psychologist who provides psychological reports on criminals and staff including Brennan and Booth

Recurring cast 
 Patricia Belcher as Caroline Julian, a prosecutor who often works with the team
 Mather Zickel as Aldo Clemens, an ex-priest who counseled Booth when he was a sniper
 Sunnie Pelant as Christine Booth, Seeley and Temperance's daughter
 Andrew Leeds as Christopher Pelant, a hacker and fugitive wanted by the FBI
 Ryan O'Neal as Max Keenan, Brennan's father
 Eileen Grubba as Donna Hastings, the gardener for the McNamara's, a family being targeted by the ghost killer
 Sterling Macer, Jr. as Victor Stark, the FBI Deputy Director
 Freddie Prinze, Jr. as Danny Beck, a covert CIA agent
 Joanna Cassidy as Marianne Booth, Seeley's mother
 Reed Diamond as FBI Special Agent Hayes Flynn, Booth's colleague
 Tiffany Hines as Michelle Welton, Cam's adopted daughter
 Cyndi Lauper as Avalon Harmonia, a psychic
 Scott Lowell as Dr. Douglas Filmore, a Canadian podiatrist
 Ty Panitz as Parker Booth, Booth's son
 Jonno Roberts as Jeffrey Hodgins, Dr. Jack Hodgins older brother
 Ralph Waite as Hank Booth, Seeley's grandfather

Interns
 Eugene Byrd as Dr. Clark Edison
 Carla Gallo as Daisy Wick
 Michael Grant Terry as Wendell Bray
 Pej Vahdat as Arastoo Vaziri
 Brian Klugman as Dr. Oliver Wells
 Joel David Moore as Colin Fisher
 Luke Kleintank as Finn Abernathy
 Ignacio Serricchio as Rodolfo Fuentes
 Laura Spencer as Jessica Warren

Production 
The series was renewed for a ninth season on January 9, 2013. The season features two extra episodes that were produced during the eighth season, but were not aired; they aired during the first half of season nine. Recurring antagonist Christopher Pelant (Andrew Leeds) returned for two episodes, which concluded his multiple-episode arc. New recurring characters in the season include Danny Beck, played by Freddie Prinze, Jr., a covert CIA agent who is an old associate of Booth; and Aldo Clemens, played by Mather Zickel, who served as Booth's advisor when he was a sniper. Both characters first appeared in the season premiere. The season also introduces new recurring Jeffersonian intern Rodolfo Fuentes, played by Ignacio Serricchio, who is a Cuban forensic anthropologist seeking asylum in the U.S.

Episodes

DVD release 
The ninth season of Bones was released on DVD format only (subtitled "Til Death Do Us Part Edition") in region 1 on September 16, 2014, in region 2 on September 15, 2014, and in region 4 on November 26, 2014. The set includes all 24 episodes of season nine on a 6-disc DVD set presented in anamorphic widescreen. Special features include an audio commentary on "The Woman in White" by Hart Hanson, Stephen Nathan and Karine Rosenthal, deleted scenes, a gag reel, and two featurettes—"Walking Down the Aisle, Bones Style" and "Bones at Comic-Con 2013".

References 

General references

External links 
 
 

Season 09
2013 American television seasons
2014 American television seasons